Tetrops starkii is a species of beetle in the family Cerambycidae. It was described by Chevrolat in 1859. It has a wide distribution in Europe. It feeds on Fraxinus excelsior and Fraxinus angustifolia.

Varietas
 Tetrops starkii var. vicina Pic, 1928
 Tetrops starkii var. mesmini Pic, 1928

References

Tetropini
Beetles described in 1859